Ali is the third mixtape by American rapper Mike G. It was released as a free digital download on the Odd Future website on April 13, 2010. The album features production and guest appearances from fellow Odd Future members Tyler, the Creator, Left Brain, Syd tha Kyd, Earl Sweatshirt, and MellowHype, as well as Vince Staples

Track listing 

Notes
 "Stick Up" features additional vocals by Taco.
 "Brown Bag ('04 FTA)" features additional vocals by Vince Staples.
 Tyler, the Creator is credited as Wolf Haley on "BlaccFriday."

References

External links 
 Odd Future website

2010 albums
Odd Future
Albums produced by Tyler, the Creator
Albums produced by Left Brain